Bankim Ghosh Memorial Girls' High School is a girls' school located at Mohan Chand Street, Watganj, Kolkata, West Bengal. The school is affiliated to the West Bengal Board of Secondary Education for Madhyamik Pariksha (10th Board exams), and to the West Bengal Council of Higher Secondary Education for Higher Secondary Examination (12th Board exams). The school was established in 1934.

References 

High schools and secondary schools in West Bengal
Girls' schools in Kolkata
Educational institutions established in 1934
1934 establishments in India